The 1940 San Francisco Dons football team was an American football team that represented the University of San Francisco as an independent during the 1940 college football season. In their fourth and final season under head coach George Malley, the Dons compiled a 1–6–1 record and were outscored by their opponents by a combined total of 125 to 73.

Schedule

References

San Francisco
San Francisco Dons football seasons
San Francisco Dons football